Mike Bayrack (born September 17, 1978) is a Canadian former professional ice hockey player.

Playing career
Bayrack had played ten seasons of professional hockey in the United States, and also had experience in Europe having played in Denmark, Germany, Slovenia, the UK, and Poland.

After playing the 2013–14 with Polish club,  KH Sanok in the Polska Hokej Liga, Bayrack agreed to return to North America from four seasons abroad to play under former teammate and Head Coach Brad Smyth, in signing a one-year contract with the Denver Cutthroats in the Central Hockey League on June 24, 2014. Prior to the 2014–15 season, Bayrack was released from his contract with the Cutthroats, after the team announced immediate dormancy due to financial issues on August 20, 2014.

Career statistics

References

External links

1978 births
Belfast Giants players
Braehead Clan players
Bridgeport Sound Tigers players
Canadian ice hockey centres
Charlotte Checkers (1993–2010) players
Coventry Blaze players
Danbury Trashers players
Florida Everblades players
Grand Rapids Griffins players
Greensboro Generals players
Gwinnett Gladiators players
Heilbronner EC players
Jackson Bandits players
Lethbridge Hurricanes players
Living people
Medicine Hat Tigers players
Missouri River Otters players
Muskegon Lumberjacks players
Norfolk Admirals players
Prince George Cougars players
KH Sanok players
SønderjyskE Ishockey players
Ice hockey people from Edmonton
Springfield Falcons players
Stockton Thunder players
Texas Wildcatters players
Toledo Storm players
Canadian expatriate ice hockey players in Poland
Canadian expatriate ice hockey players in England
Canadian expatriate ice hockey players in Scotland
Canadian expatriate ice hockey players in Germany
Canadian expatriate ice hockey players in Slovenia
Canadian expatriate ice hockey players in Denmark
Canadian expatriate ice hockey players in Northern Ireland
Canadian expatriate ice hockey players in the United States